Eiszeit may refer to:

 Ice Age (1975 film) (German: Eiszeit), a 1975 West German drama film
 Eiszeit (song), an NDW (Neue Deutsche Welle) cult song from the German band Ideal from the album Der Ernst des Lebens
 Eiszeit (album), an album by Eisbrecher